The Dahanayake Cabinet was the central government of Ceylon led by Prime Minister W. Dahanayake between 1959 and 1960. It was formed in September 1959 after the assassination of Dahanayake's predecessor S. W. R. D. Bandaranaike and it ended in March 1960 after the opposition's victory in the parliamentary election.

Cabinet members

Parliamentary secretaries

Notes

References

Cabinet of Sri Lanka
Ministries of Elizabeth II
1959 establishments in Ceylon
1960 disestablishments in Ceylon
Cabinets established in 1959
Cabinets disestablished in 1960